Major-General Ladislaus Herbert Richard Pope-Hennessy  (1875 – 1 March 1942) was a British Army officer and Liberal Party politician of Irish Catholic descent.

Background

He was the eldest son of Sir John Pope-Hennessy MP, of Rostellan Castle, County Cork and Catherine Elizabeth Low. He was educated at Beaumont College.

Military career
Pope-Hennessy was commissioned into the Oxfordshire Light Infantry in 1895. He was deployed to South Africa and served with the West African Frontier Force during the Second Boer War. He subsequently became commandant of the 4th Battalion, King's African Rifles in 1906 for which service was appointed a Companion of the Distinguished Service Order in 1908.

During the First World War he became commanding officer of the 1st Battalion the Oxfordshire and Buckinghamshire Light Infantry in Mesopotamia in 1916 and then became a staff officer with the British Indian Army in 1917.

After the war he served as a staff officer at the War Office and then was Military Inter-Allied Commissioner of Control in Berlin. Subsequently he spent three years as military attaché in Washington D.C. He became General Officer Commanding 50th (Northumbrian) Division in 1931 before retiring in 1935.

Pope-Hennessy published a number of books an articles on military matters and in one of them he predicted the technique of the German Blitzkrieg.

Political career
He took particular interest in military matters and in issues affecting his native Ireland. In 1919 he had published 'The Irish Dominion: a Method of Approach to a Settlement'. 
He was Liberal candidate for the Tonbridge Division of Kent at the 1935 General Election. Tonbridge was a safe Conservative seat that they had won at every election since it was created in 1918. The Liberal Party had not fielded a candidate at the previous General election and he was not expected to win and finished a poor third.

Family
He married, in 1910, Una Birch a writer, historian and biographer. They had two sons, James who became a writer and John an art historian.

Death

He died in 1942 and is buried alongside his wife at Friary Church of St Francis and St Anthony, Crawley.

References

1875 births
1942 deaths
Burials in Sussex
British military attachés
British Army personnel of the Second Boer War
British Army major generals
British Army personnel of World War I
Oxfordshire and Buckinghamshire Light Infantry officers
King's African Rifles officers
People from County Cork
Companions of the Order of the Bath
Companions of the Distinguished Service Order